Burtina is a genus of moths in the family Geometridae.

Species
 Burtina atribasalis (Warren, 1899)
 Burtina continua Walker, [1865]

References
 Burtina at Markku Savela's Lepidoptera and Some Other Life Forms
Natural History Museum Lepidoptera genus database

Ennominae